The St. Thomas Stars are a Canadian junior ice hockey team based in St. Thomas, Ontario, Canada.  The team plays in the Western division of the Greater Ontario Junior Hockey League.

History
Junior ice hockey in St. Thomas began in 1961 with the St. Thomas Barons in the Western Ontario Junior "B" Hockey League. The league was replaced by the Southern Ontario Junior A Hockey League in 1970, and the Barons switched to the new league and changed their name to the Elgins. The Elgins folded in 1973, and were merged into the St. Thomas Colonels in the Central Junior C Hockey League. The team moved into the Southwestern Ontario Junior "B" Hockey League in 1976, and then into the Western Ontario Junior Hockey League in 1978. The Colonels changed their name to the Pests in 1980, and then to the Stars in 1984.

1968–69 season
The Barons won the league championship during the 1968–69 season, then played against the Flin Flon Bombers from the Western Canada Hockey League (WCHL) for the Canadian Hockey Association east-west final, and for the Father Athol Murray Trophy. The series was a best-of-seven format which began in St. Thomas. It was the first Canadian national junior ice hockey championship played which was not under the jurisdiction of the Canadian Amateur Hockey Association.

The Barons withdrew from the championship series during the fourth game, played at the Whitney Forum in Flin Flon on May 5. The team left after an on-ice brawl during the second period. The referee defaulted the game to the Bombers, who were leading by a 4–0 score at the time. The Bombers led the series three games to one after the default win. Game five was scheduled in Flin Flon on May 7, and games six and seven would have been in St. Thomas if necessary. The Barons were escorted from the arena to their hotel by the Royal Canadian Mounted Police due to fear of violence. The Canadian Press described the Barons as being over-matched in the series and were not up to the calibre of the WCHL. The Barons abandoned the series in the interest of player safety, and departed for home on May 6, despite a scheduled game on May 7 in Flin Flon. The team paid its own expenses to get home, with assistance from some of its fans who made the road trip to Manitoba.

Canadian Hockey Association president Ron Butlin awarded the series to Flin Flon, and suspended the St. Thomas Barons from the association. Barons' coach Keith Kewly said the decision was his to abandon the series.

Season-by-season results

Barons/Elgins season-by-season results

Playoffs
1969 Won League, Lost CHA Championship
St. Thomas Barons defeated Chatham Maroons 4-games-to-2
St. Thomas Barons defeated Brantford Foresters 4-games-to-none WOJAHL CHAMPIONS
Flin Flon Bombers (WCHL) defeated St. Thomas Barons 2-games-to-1 and series default
1970 Lost Semi-final
Chatham Maroons defeated St. Thomas Barons 4-games-to-none
1971 DNQ
1972 Lost Semi-final
Guelph CMC's defeated St. Thomas Barons 4-games-to-none
1973 DNQ

Sutherland Cup appearances
1962: Waterloo Siskins defeated St. Thomas Barons 4-games-to-1
1987: St. Thomas Stars defeated Niagara Falls Canucks 4-games-to-none
1995: Stratford Cullitons defeated St. Thomas Stars 4-games-to-none
1996: Niagara Falls Canucks defeated St. Thomas Stars 4-games-to-2

Notable alumni

Gregory Campbell
Dan Cloutier
Logan Couture
John Cullen
Rick Foley
Bo Horvat
Ken Murray
Danny Schock
Joe Thornton
Brian Willsie

References

External links
Stars Webpage
GOJHL Webpage

Western Junior B Hockey League teams
St. Thomas, Ontario